Swimming, for the 2013 Island Games, took place at the National Sports Center in Devonshire Parish, Bermuda. Competition took place from 15 to 18 July 2013.  The events are held in a short course (25 m) pool.

Medal table

Medal summary of events

Men's events

Women's events

Mixed

References

2013 Island Games
2013 in swimming
2013